Setapak Central, previously known as KL Festival City, is a shopping mall located along Jalan Genting Klang in Kuala Lumpur, Malaysia. It is situated in Danau Kota, a township in Setapak.

History

KL Festival City was constructed on an  land at a cost of RM 215 million by Parkson Holdings (PHB) and opened its doors on 20 October 2011 with the grand opening held on 9 March 2012. The opening of KL Festival City also marks a new milestone for PHB with its entry into shopping mall management. Since then, it has become a new landmark at Jalan Genting Klang and popular spot amongst students and families from nearby colleges such as Tunku Abdul Rahman University College and neighbourhoods.

In August 2014, PHB announced the disposal of KL Festival City for RM 349 million cash as the mall was deemed too small for Parkson's expansion plan to construct premium shopping malls with a net lettable area of 1 million sq ft. In a statement to Bursa Malaysia, Parkson said the disposal would result in a gain of about RM 110 million. Under the sales and purchase agreement, PHB agreed to sell KL Festival City to Festiva Mall Sdn Bhd, which is wholly owned subsidiary of AsiaMalls Sdn Bhd.

On 5 October 2015, the mall changed its name to "Setapak Central" as it seeks to create "an engaging shopping and lifestyle experiences in the Setapak neighbourhood". Apart from that, the retail philosophy of Setapak Central is "to have a good enough mall for the people of Setapak so they need not drive to (the city centre of) Kuala Lumpur".

Tenants

Anchor Tenants
Setapak Central consists of more than 250 stores that spans across four levels with Parkson, MBO Cinemas and Econsave being the anchor tenants of the mall.

Key Tenants
Some of the key tenants in the mall include Swedish fashion retailer H&M, Australian fashion chain Cotton On, Superstar Karaoke, TBM Electrical, Home's Harmony, Daiso, Kaison, The Coffee Bean & Tea Leaf, Texas Chicken and more.

Transport
Setapak Central is easily accessible via MRR2, DUKE and Jalan Genting Klang. The mall is just 8-minute driving distance away from Wangsa Maju LRT station.

RapidKL Buses
Setapak Central is accessible via the following rapidKL buses.
: Taman Melati LRT station - Medan Idaman Gombak - Taman Setapak - Columbia Asia Hospital - Setapak Central - Taman Melati LRT station
: Wangsa Maju LRT station - Desa Setapak - Setapak Central - Danau Kota - Tunku Abdul Rahman University College - Wangsa Maju LRT station

References

External links 

 

Shopping malls in Kuala Lumpur
Shopping malls established in 2011
2011 establishments in Malaysia